Brooks High School may refer to:

Brooks High School (Launceston, Tasmania), Australia
Brooks High School (Alabama), United States